SS Eastland was a passenger ship based in Chicago and used for tours. On 24 July 1915, the ship rolled over onto its side while tied to a dock in the Chicago River. In total, 844 passengers and crew were killed in what was the largest loss of life from a single shipwreck on the Great Lakes.

After the disaster, Eastland was salvaged and sold to the United States Navy. After restorations and modifications, Eastland was designated a gunboat and renamed USS Wilmette. She was used primarily as a training vessel on the Great Lakes, and was scrapped after World War II.

Construction
The ship was commissioned during 1902 by the Michigan Steamship Company and built by the Jenks Ship Building Company of Port Huron, Michigan. The ship was named in May 1903, immediately before her inaugural voyage.

History

Early problems
On 27 July of her 1903 inaugural season, the ship struck the laid up tugboat George W. Gardner, which sank at its dock at the Lake Street Bridge in Chicago, Illinois.  Eastland received only minor damage.

Mutiny on the Eastland
On 14 August 1903, while on a cruise from Chicago to South Haven, Michigan, six of the ship's firemen refused to stoke the fire for the ship's boiler. They claimed that they had not received their potatoes for a meal. When they refused to return to the fire hole, Captain John Pereue arrested the six men at gunpoint. Firemen George Lippen and Benjamin Myers, who were not a part of the group of six, stoked the fires until the ship reached harbor. Upon the ship's arrival in South Haven, the six men – Glenn Watson, Mike Davern, Frank La Plarte, Edward Fleming, Mike Smith, and William Madden – were taken to the town jail and charged with mutiny. Shortly thereafter, Captain Pereue was replaced.

Speed modifications
Because the ship did not meet a targeted speed of  during her inaugural season, and had a draft too deep for the Black River in South Haven, Michigan, where she was being loaded, the ship returned in September 1903 to Port Huron for modifications, including the addition of an air conditioning system and machinery adjustments to reduce draft. Even though the modifications increased the ship's speed, they added additional weight and reduced her draft, thereby reducing the metacentric height and inherent stability as originally designed.

Listing incidents
Upon her return to South Haven, in May 1904, the ship handily won a race against the City of South Haven to Chicago. In the meantime, the Eastland was experiencing periodic problems with her stability while loading and unloading cargo and passengers, and nearly capsized on 17 July 1904, after leaving South Haven with about 3,000 passengers. Subsequently, her capacity was lowered to 2,800 passengers, cabins were removed, lifeboats were added, and the hull was repaired. Then, on 5 August 1906, another incident of listing occurred, which resulted in the filing of complaints against the Chicago-South Haven Line that had purchased the ship earlier that year.

Before the 1907 season, the ship was sold to the Lake Shore Navigation Company, and moved to Lake Erie. In 1909, the ship was sold again to the Eastland Navigation Company, and continued running excursions between Cleveland and Cedar Point. After the 1909 season, the remaining 39 cabins were removed, and prior to the 1912 season, the top smoke stack sections were removed to shorten her stack height. On 1 July 1912, another incident occurred when the Eastland had a severe listing of around 25° while loading passengers in Cleveland.

In June 1914, the Eastland was sold to the St. Joseph-Chicago Steamship Company, and returned to Lake Michigan for St. Joseph, Michigan, to Chicago, Illinois, service.

The Eastland disaster
On 24 July 1915, Eastland and four other Great Lakes passenger steamers – Theodore Roosevelt, Petoskey, Racine, and Rochester – were chartered to take employees from Western Electric Company's Hawthorne Works in Cicero, Illinois, to a picnic in Michigan City, Indiana. This was a major event in the lives of the workers, many of whom could not take holidays.

During 1915, the new federal Seamen's Act had been passed because of the RMS Titanic disaster three years earlier. The law required retrofitting of a complete set of lifeboats on Eastland, as on many other passenger vessels. This additional weight may have made Eastland more dangerous by making her even more top heavy. Some argued that other Great Lakes ships would suffer from the same problem. Nonetheless, it was signed into law by President Woodrow Wilson. Eastland had the option of maintaining a reduced capacity or adding lifeboats to increase capacity. Its leadership elected to add lifeboats to qualify for a license to increase its capacity to 2,570 passengers. Eastland was already so top heavy that she had special restrictions concerning the number of passengers that could be carried. Prior to that, during June 1914, Eastland had again changed ownership, this time bought by the St. Joseph and Chicago Steamship Company, with Captain Harry Pedersen appointed the ship's master. They also added a layer of concrete near the aft gangway. Together, this added 15-20 tons of weight.

On the morning of 24 July, passengers began boarding Eastland on the south bank of the Chicago River between Clark and LaSalle Streets about 6:30 am, and by 7:10 am, the ship had reached her capacity of 2,572 passengers. The ship was packed, with many passengers standing on the open upper decks, and began to list slightly to the port side (away from the wharf). The crew attempted to stabilize the ship by admitting water into her ballast tanks, but to little avail. Many other passengers had already moved below decks on this relatively cool and damp morning to warm themselves before the departure. Consequently, hundreds of people were trapped inside by the water and the sudden rollover; some were crushed by heavy furniture, including pianos, bookcases, and tables. Although the ship was only  from the wharf, and in spite of the quick response by the crew of a nearby vessel, Kenosha, which came alongside the hull to allow those stranded on the capsized vessel to leap to safety, 844 passengers and four crew members died in the disaster. Many of the passengers on Eastland were immigrants, with large numbers from present-day Czech Republic, Poland, Norway, Germany, Ireland, Sweden, Denmark, Italy, Hungary, and Austria. Many of the Czech immigrants had settled in Cicero; of the Czech passengers aboard, 220 perished in the disaster.

The bodies of the victims were taken to various temporary morgues established in the area for identification; by afternoon, the remaining unidentified bodies were consolidated in the Armory of the 2nd Regiment.

In the aftermath, the Western Electric Company provided $100,000 to relief and recovery efforts of family members of the victims of the disaster.

One of the people who were scheduled to be on Eastland was 20-year-old George Halas, an American football player, who was delayed leaving for the dock, and arrived after the ship had overturned. His name was listed on the list of deceased in newspapers, but when fraternity brothers visited his home to send their condolences, he was revealed to be unharmed. Halas went on to become coach and owner of the Chicago Bears and a founding member of the National Football League. His friend and future Bears executive Ralph Brizzolara and his brother were on the Eastland when she capsized, though they escaped through portholes. Despite stories to the contrary, no reliable evidence indicates Jack Benny was aboard Eastland or scheduled to be on the excursion; possibly the basis for this report was that Eastland was a training vessel during World War I and Benny received his training in the Great Lakes naval base where Eastland was stationed.

The first known film footage taken of the recovery efforts was discovered and then released during early 2015 by a graduate student at the University of Illinois at Chicago.

Marion Eichholz – the last known survivor of the capsizing – died on 24 November 2014, at the age of 102.

Eastland disaster and the media
Writer Jack Woodford witnessed the disaster and gave a first-hand account to the Herald and Examiner, a Chicago newspaper. In his autobiography, Woodford writes:

Newspapers played a significant part in not only publicizing the Eastland disaster, but also creating the public memory of the catastrophe. The newspapers' purpose, audience, and political and business associations influenced the newspapers to publish articles emphasizing who was to blame and why Eastland capsized. Consequently, the articles influenced how the court cases proceeded, and contributed to a dispute between Western Electric Company and some of its workers regarding how the company responded to the catastrophe.

Carl Sandburg, then known better as a journalist than a poet, wrote an angry account accusing regulators of ignoring safety issues and claimed that many of the workers were there on company orders for a staged picnic. Sandburg also wrote a poem, "The Eastland", that contrasts the disaster with the mistreatment and poor health of the lower classes at the time. After first listing the quick, murderous horrors of the disaster, then surveying the slow, murderous horrors of extreme poverty, Sandburg concludes by comparing the two: "I see a dozen Eastlands/Every morning on my way to work/And a dozen more going home at night." The poem was too harsh for publication when written but was eventually released as part of a collection of poems during 1993.

The Eastland disaster was incorporated into the 1999 series premiere of the Disney Channel original series So Weird. In the episode, teenaged paranormal enthusiast Fiona Phillips (actress Cara DeLizia) encounters the ghost of a young boy who drowned during the capsizing while exploring a nightclub near the Chicago River, and attempts to learn why he has contacted her.

During 2012, Chicago's Lookingglass Theatre produced an original musical about the disaster entitled Eastland: A New Musical, written by Andy White and scored by Ben Collins-Sussman and Andre Pluess.

The Eastland disaster is also pivotal to the story of one family told in the play/musical Failure: A Love Story, written by Philip Dawkins, which premiered in Chicago in 2012 at Victory Gardens Theater. Its Los Angeles production, directed by Michael Matthews, and produced by Couerage Theater Company, premiered on 24 July 2015 – the 100th anniversary of the Eastland tragedy. Ten years after its world premiere, the Oil Lamp Theater mounted Failure: A Love Story, directed by Xavier Custodio and stage managed by Rochelle Hovde, and starring Kendal Romero, Trevor Earley, BroadwayWorld Award-winner Van Ferro, Philip Macaluso, BroadwayWorld Award-nominee Jasmine Robertson and Jordan Zelvin as part of its cast. On November 15, 2022, this production garnered 9 nominations from the 2022 BroadwayWorld Chicago Awards: Best Play for Oil Lamp Theater, Best Director of a Play for Custodio; Best Performer in a Play for Earley and Romero; Best Supporting Performer in a Play for Ferro, Macaluso, Robinson, and Zelvin; Best Scenic Design, Best Lighting Design and Best Sound Design. On December 31, 2022, as part of the Chicago theater awards season, Failure: A Love Story was chosen as one of the 24 Best of Chicago Theater productions by Picture This Post. On January 23, 2023, Failure: A Love Story won 2 BroadwayWorld Chicago Awards for Best Play and for Ferro (Best Supporting Performer in a Play), marking consecutive wins in those categories for Oil Lamp Theater and Ferro, respectively. The production had 4 runner-up citations for Best Performer in a Play (Romero), Best Sound Design, Best Lighting Design and Best Scenic Design.

Inquiry and indictments
A grand jury indicted the president and three other officers of the steamship company for manslaughter, and the ship's captain and engineer for criminal carelessness, and found that the disaster was caused by "conditions of instability" caused by any or all of overloading of passengers, mishandling of water ballast, or the construction of the ship.

Federal extradition hearings were held to compel the six indicted men to come from Michigan to Illinois for trial. During the hearings, principal witness Sidney Jenks, president of the shipbuilding company that built Eastland, testified that her first owners wanted a fast ship to transport fruit, and he designed one capable of making  and carrying 500 passengers. Defense counsel Clarence Darrow asked whether he had ever worried about the conversion of the ship into a passenger steamer with a capacity of 2,500 or more passengers. Jenks replied, "I had no way of knowing the quantity of its business after it left our yards... No, I did not worry about the Eastland." Jenks testified that an actual stability test of the ship never occurred, and stated that after tilting to an angle of 45° at launching, "it righted itself as straight as a church, satisfactorily demonstrating its stability."

The court refused extradition, holding the evidence was too weak, with "barely a scintilla of proof" to establish probable cause to find the six guilty. The court reasoned that the four company officers were not aboard the ship, and that every act charged against the captain and engineer was done in the ordinary course of business, "more consistent with innocence than with guilt." The court also reasoned that Eastland "was operated for years and carried thousands safely", and that for this reason no one could say that the accused parties were unjustified in believing the ship seaworthy.

Gallery of the Eastland Disaster

Second life as USS Wilmette

After Eastland was raised on 14 August 1915, she was sold to the Illinois Naval Reserve and recommissioned as USS Wilmette stationed at Great Lakes Naval Base. She was converted to a gunboat, renamed Wilmette on 20 February 1918, and commissioned on 20 September 1918, with Captain William B. Wells. Commissioned late in World War I, Wilmette did not have any combat service. It trained sailors and experienced normal upkeep and repairs until placed in ordinary at Chicago on 9 July 1919, retaining a 10-man caretaker crew aboard. On 29 June 1920, the gunboat was returned to full commission.

On 7 June 1921, Wilmette was given the task of sinking UC-97, a German U-boat surrendered to the United States after World War I. The guns of Wilmette were manned by Gunner's Mate J. O. Sabin, who had fired the first American cannon of World War I, and Gunner's Mate A. F. Anderson, the man who fired the first American torpedo of the conflict.

For the remainder of her 25-year career, the gunboat served as a training ship for naval reservists of the 9th, 10th, and 11th Naval Districts. It made voyages along the shores of the Great Lakes carrying trainees assigned to her from the Naval Station Great Lakes in Illinois. Ernie Pyle, the famed World War II correspondent, was one of those trainees when he spent three weeks on the ship during late summer 1921. Wilmette remained in commission, performing her reserve training mission until she was placed "out of commission, in service", on 15 February 1940.

Given hull designation IX-29 on 17 February 1941, she resumed training duty at Chicago on 30 March 1942, preparing armed guard crews for duty manning the guns on armed merchantmen. That assignment continued until the end of World War II in Europe obviated measures to protect trans-Atlantic merchant shipping from German U-boats.

During August 1943, Wilmette was given the honor of transporting President Franklin D. Roosevelt, Admiral William D. Leahy, James F. Byrnes, and Harry Hopkins on a 10-day cruise to McGregor and Whitefish Bay to plan war strategies.

On 9 April 1945, she was returned to full commission for a brief interval. Wilmette was decommissioned on 28 November 1945, and her name was deleted from the Navy list on 19 December 1945. During 1946, Wilmette was offered for sale. Finding no takers, on 31 October 1946, she was sold to the Hyman Michaels Company for scrapping, which was completed in 1947.

Memorials

A marker commemorating the accident was dedicated on 4 June 1989. This marker was reported stolen on 26 April 2000, and a replacement marker was installed and rededicated on 24 July 2003.

Plans exist for a permanent outdoor exhibit with the proposed name "At The River's Edge". This exhibit would be located along the portion of the Chicago Riverwalk adjacent to the waters where the Eastland disaster occurred. The exhibit is planned to consist of six displays, each containing two unique panels which will serve to illustrate the tragedy through text and high-resolution images.
 
On Sunday, 12 July 2015, one hundred years after the SS Eastland disaster, a memorial to the dead was dedicated at Bohemian National Cemetery, 5255 N. Pulaski Road, Chicago.

See also
List of maritime disasters
PS General Slocum
Sea Wing disaster

Notes

References

Further reading
Jay Bonansinga, The Sinking of the Eastland: America's Forgotten Tragedy, Citadel Press 2004. 

 Green, Jocelyn, Drawn By The Current, Bethany House Publishers 2022. 
George Hilton, Eastland: Legacy of the Titanic, Stanford University Press 1997. 

Michael McCarthy, Ashes Under Water: The SS Eastland and the Shipwreck that Shook America, Lyons Press 2014. 
 
Ted Wachholz, The Eastland Disaster, Arcadia Publishing 2005. 
Zett, Natalie, Flower in the River, Zidova Publishing 2021. ISBN 978-1737579618

External links

 Eastland Disaster Historical Society
 MaritimeQuest Eastland Photo Gallery
 Chicago Tribune Photographs

1903 ships
!Eastland
Disasters in Illinois
Gunboats of the United States Navy
History of Chicago
Maritime incidents in 1915
Passenger ships of the United States
Shipwrecks of Lake Michigan
Steamships of the United States
Steamships of the United States Navy
Maritime incidents in the United States
Ships built in Port Huron, Michigan